Pure is a healthy food to go chain based in London, United Kingdom. It serves nutritious breakfast and lunch of wraps, salads, hot boxes and sides with a wide range of vegan and vegetarian items. Coffee is ethically sourced and locally roasted. Smoothies and juices are freshly made on-site.

History 

The company was founded by Spencer Craig with the first Pure store opening in Beak Street, Soho, in 2009.

In 2015, Pure was included in The Sunday Times Fast Track 100 as one of the fastest growing and profitable companies of 2015 with a 65% annual sales rise over 3 years.

In 2016 Whitbread, the FTSE 100 leisure group behind Premier Inn and Costa Coffee, bought a 49 per cent stake in the company, acquired for £6.8m and having the option to buy the remainder of the company within the next five years.

Pure was included again in 2016 in The Sunday Times Fast Track 100, consolidating the company as one of the most prominent options in the food chain market.

As of January 2019, Pure has 18 shops opened in London, mainly based in the City and around Soho. Pure employs more than 400 people among team members, assistant managers, and General Managers.

Menu 

Pure’s menu includes breakfast items, salads, wraps, juices and smoothies, hot drinks, pots and snacks.

The company uses organic and seasonal ingredients, advertising that their food is freshly made every day in the kitchen at each store.

References

Fast-food chains of the United Kingdom
British companies established in 2009
Restaurants established in 2009
2009 establishments in the United Kingdom
Companies based in the City of London